The 2016–17 Drexel Dragons women's basketball team represented Drexel University during the 2016–17 NCAA Division I women's basketball season. The Dragons, led by fourteenth year head coach Denise Dillon, played their home games at the Daskalakis Athletic Center and were members of the Colonial Athletic Association (CAA). They finished the season 22–11, 11–7 in CAA play to finish in third place. They advanced to the semifinals of the CAA women's tournament where they lost to James Madison. They were invited to the Women's National Invitational Tournament where they defeated Duquesne in the first round before losing to Villanova in the second round.

Off season

2016 Recruiting Class

Roster

Schedule

|-
!colspan=12 style="background:#FFC600; color:#07294D;"| Non-conference regular season

|-
!colspan=12 style="background:#FFC600; color:#07294D;"| CAA regular season

|-
!colspan=12 style="background:#FFC600; color:#07294D;"| CAA Tournament

|-
!colspan=12 style="background:#FFC600; color:#07294D;"| WNIT

See also
2016–17 Drexel Dragons men's basketball team

References

Drexel Dragons women's basketball seasons
Drexel
Drexel
Drexel
2017 Women's National Invitation Tournament participants